Soanenga is a town and commune in western Madagascar. It belongs to the district of Besalampy, which is a part of Melaky Region. The population of the commune was estimated to be approximately 9,000 in 2001 commune census.

Soanenga has a riverine harbour. Only primary schooling is available. Farming and raising livestock provides employment for 48% and 30% of the working population.  The most important crop is rice, while other important products are coconuts and seeds of catechu.  Services provide employment for 2% of the population. Additionally fishing employs 20% of the population.

Towns 

 Amparihy-Bejofo

References and notes 

Populated places in Melaky